Elionar Nascimento Ribeiro (born June 10, 1982 in Santa Luzia, Brazil), known as Elionar Bombinha, is a Brazilian football player currently playing for Cuiabá.

Elionar joined Turkish Süper Lig side Çaykur Rizespor in July 2007 and has played for three seasons, making 94 appearances with 24 goals. In July 2011, he moved to South Korean club Incheon United in forward position, on loan from ABC Futebol Clube.

External links
 
 

1982 births
Living people
Brazilian footballers
Brazilian expatriate footballers
Çaykur Rizespor footballers
Incheon United FC players
ABC Futebol Clube players
Agremiação Sportiva Arapiraquense players
São Bernardo Futebol Clube players
Brazilian expatriate sportspeople in Turkey
Expatriate footballers in Turkey
Brazilian expatriate sportspeople in South Korea
Expatriate footballers in South Korea
Süper Lig players
K League 1 players
Cuiabá Esporte Clube players
Association football forwards